William Boomer (April 13, 1937 – January 9, 2022), also known as Buzz Boomer, was an American college swimming coach. At the University of Rochester, he served as the head coach of the men's swim team from 1962 to 1990. From the early 1990s, Boomer had been a guest speaker for the Stanford University swim team and had worked one-on-one with many world-class swimmers. Boomer was a coach for the 2000 U.S. Olympic team.

Boomer had no experience coaching swimming when he started at Rochester. The graduate assistant to the track and field team had in fact never seen a swim meet prior to being offered the job. In order to better understand his swimmers, Boomer studied how the human body reacted to the water in a pool. From there, Boomer developed swimming techniques similar to those used by aquatic animals and those techniques would go on to be adapted by some of the best swimmers in the world. Boomer's techniques emphasize keeping the core body aligned properly to minimize water resistance.

Boomer and his coaching staff were named the 1998 UAA Coaching Staff of the Year. Boomer also coached the men's soccer team at the University of Rochester from 1965 to 1969, leading the team to a 24–26–3 record. Early in Boomer's career as the University of Rochester Varsity Swim coach, he coached the 1966–1967 Men's Varsity Swim Team to an undefeated season, 11–0.  This was the first of many other successful swim seasons. Boomer was inducted into the University of Rochester Athletic Hall of Fame in 2007.

Personal life and death
As an adolescent, Boomer lost several fingers in a farming accident, and he credited coping with the trauma of that episode as an integral part of shaping many of his life and coaching philosophies.

Boomer and his second wife, Sally Fischbeck, resided in Clifford, Pennsylvania. He had two adult children from a previous marriage. He died on January 9, 2022, at the age of 84.

Notable protégés
 Josh Davis, world record-holder and Olympic gold-medalist
 James A. Pawelczyk, NASA astronaut
 Jenny Thompson, world record-holder and Olympic gold-medalist
 Dara Torres, world record-holder and Olympic gold-medalist
 Amy Van Dyken, world record-holder and Olympic gold-medalist

References

External links
 Rochester Swimming and Diving profile

1937 births
2022 deaths
American swimming coaches
College swimming coaches in the United States
Rochester Yellowjackets coaches
Stanford Cardinal coaches